Ak-Terek is a village in the Jeti-Ögüz District of the Issyk-Kul Region in Kyrgyzstan. Its population was 4,327 in 2021.

References

Populated places in Issyk-Kul Region